Aeroplane was the second solo album released by Curt Smith, member of the British pop band Tears for Fears.

It was released in two versions, a 14-song (15 if you count the hidden track) version in 1999 in Canada through the Sour Music label, and a 6-song EP in 2000 on Curt Smith's own Zerodisc label.
 
The Canadian version contains songs that were originally on the 1998 self-titled album from the band Mayfield (of which Curt Smith was a member). The US release consisted mostly of songs from the Canadian release not found on the Mayfield album. It also contains two versions of Tears For Fears songs, Pale Shelter in a more rock mood and a live acoustic rendition of Everybody Wants to Rule the World.

Track listing

Canadian 1999 release 

 "Aeroplane" 
 "What Are We Fighting For" 
 "Sorry Town" 
 "Jasmine" (titled "Jasmine's Taste" on the Mayfield album)
 "Reach Out" 
 "Pale Shelter" 
 "Trees" 
 "Where Do I Go" 
 "Mother England" 
 "Snow Hill" 
 "I Don't Want to Be Around" 
 "Sun King" 
 "Gone Again" 
 "Everybody Wants to Rule the World (Acoustic)"  
 Hidden Track: "Snow Hill" (remix)

US 2000 EP 

 "Aeroplane" 
 "Pale Shelter" 
 "Where Do I Go" 
 "Snow Hill" (remix) 
 "Reach Out" (remix) 
 "Everybody Wants to Rule the World (Acoustic)"

Personnel 
 Curt Smith: Vocals, back vocals, bass, guitars
 Charlton Pettus: Keyboards, guitars, back vocals
 Dan Petty: Guitars, keyboards, back vocals
 Jack Petruzzelli: Guitars, keyboards 
 Rob Arthur: Guitars, keyboards 
 Doug Petty: Keyboards, back vocals 
 Richard Pagano: Drums, percussion

Curt Smith albums
1999 albums
2000 EPs
Albums about aircraft